Leptin, serum levels of, also known as LSL, is a human gene.

References

Further reading

Genes on human chromosome 2